In late 2022, an ongoing disease outbreak caused by the bacterium Streptococcus pyogenes, a Lancefield group A streptococcus, began in the United Kingdom. It is often referred to as the Strep A outbreak in the media. These bacteria cause group A streptococcal infections (Strep A or iGAS) and scarlet fever. In the UK, 310 deaths from iGAS have been recorded, of which 43 were children, 34 in England, five in Wales, three in Scotland, and one in Northern Ireland.

There were 2,178 notifications of iGAS recorded in England between 12 September 2022 and 26 February 2023. Notifications of scarlet fever have also seen a large increase, with 47,084 infections reported in England during the same period.

Background 
Group A streptococcal infections are diseases, including scarlet fever, which are caused by the bacterium Streptococcus pyogenes, a Lancefield group A streptococcus (GAS). In 2007 it was estimated that GAS infections cause over 500,000 deaths per year. On very rare occasions, GAS enter the bloodstream and cause an illness called invasive group A strep (iGAS) which is very serious, particularly in older, younger and more vulnerable groups.

In the United Kingdom, the UK Health Security Agency (UKHSA) has said that the last comparably high season was the 2017/18 season, where 355 deaths occurred from iGAS, 27 of which were children. During this season the UKHSA also received total of 30,768 reports of scarlet fever.

Deaths 
So far, 310 deaths have been recorded within 7 days of an iGAS infection, 43 of which were children. The other reported deaths are people over the age of at least 15. Usually, only one or two children under the age of 10 die from GAS infections during a typical winter.

The case fatality rate (CFR) for iGAS from 12 September to 26 February in England was 13.8%.

Cases 
The UK Health Security Agency (UKHSA) said that an average of 2,861 (range 479 to 5,051) of scarlet fever were recorded during the same period over the past 5 years.

The following table shows the number of notifications of iGAS and scarlet fever published by data from the UKHSA from 12 September to 26 February.

Response 
During a House of Commons debate on 7 December 2022, Prime Minister Rishi Sunak was accused of downplaying the outbreak after leader of the opposition Keir Starmer questioned him on his handling of the disease. Sunak stated that the infection 'has not become more lethal'.

A survey of 626 parents' attitudes towards Strep A revealed a range of misinformation narratives, with 32% thinking that COVID-19 and flu vaccines were partly responsible for an increase in Strep A infections. Furthermore, 49% were unsure as to whether there is a link between nasal flu vaccines and Strep A. It also found that 28% were sceptical about Strep A, believing that it is a disguise being used to cover up something else. Increasing migration and refugee numbers were blamed by 33% of respondents for the increase in infections.

References 

2022 disease outbreaks
2022 disasters in the United Kingdom
2023 disease outbreaks
2023 disasters in the United Kingdom
Disease outbreaks in the United Kingdom
Scarlet fever
Streptococcal infections